Tazawa (written: 田澤 or 田沢) is a Japanese surname. Notable people with the surname include:

, Japanese footballer
, Japanese writer
, Japanese baseball player
, Japanese politician
, Japanese voice actress
, Japanese sport shooter
, Japanese footballer

See also
Tazawa Station, a railway station in Azumino, Nagano Prefecture, Japan
Lake Tazawa, a lake in Semboku, Akita Prefecture, Japan

Japanese-language surnames